The Primetime Emmy Award for Outstanding Stunt Coordination for a Comedy Series or Variety Program is awarded to one television program each year.

Prior to 2013, all programs competed in a combined category for Outstanding Stunt Coordination, but now this is split into two awards, the subject of this article, and the Outstanding Stunt Coordination for a Drama Series, Limited Series, or Movie.

In the following list, the first titles listed in gold are the winners; those not in gold are nominees, which are listed in alphabetical order. The years given are those in which the ceremonies took place:



Winners and nominations
Outstanding Stunt Coordination

2000s

2010s
{| class="wikitable" style="width:100%"
|- bgcolor="#bebebe"
! width="5%" | Year
! width="30%" | Program
! width="30%" | Episode
! width="30%" | Nominee
! width="5%" | Network
|-
|rowspan=6 style="text-align:center" | 2010(62nd)
|- style="background:#FAEB86"
|FlashForward
| align=center| "No More Good Days"
|Danny Weselis
|ABC
|-
|Chuck
| align=center| "Chuck Versus the Tic Tac"|Merritt Yohnka
|NBC
|-
|House| align=center| "Brave Heart"
|Jim Vickers
|rowspan=3 | Fox
|-
|Human Target| align=center| "Run"
|Dean Choe
|-
|24| align=center| "Day 8: 6:00 p.m. – 7:00 p.m."
|Jeff David Cadiente
|-
|rowspan=5 style="text-align:center" | 2011(63rd)
|- style="background:#FAEB86"
|Southland| align=center| "Graduation Day"
|Peewee Piemonte
|TNT
|-
|Game of Thrones| align=center| "The Wolf and the Lion"
|Paul Jennings
|HBO
|-
|Hawaii Five-0| align=center| "Ua Hiki Mai Kapalena Pau"
|Jeff David Cadiente
|CBS
|-
|Spartacus: Gods of the Arena| align=center| "The Bitter End"
|Allan Poppleton
|Starz
|-
|rowspan=7 style="text-align:center" | 2012(64th)
|- style="background:#FAEB86"
|Southland| align=center| "Wednesday"
|Peewee Piemonte
|TNT
|-
|colspan=2|American Horror Story|Tim Davison
|FX
|-
|Criminal Minds| align=center| "The Bittersweet Science"
|Tom Elliott
|CBS
|-
|Grimm| align=center| "The Woman in Black"
|Matt Taylor
|NBC
|-
|Hawaii Five-0| align=center| "Kame'e"
|Jeff David Cadiente
|rowspan=2 | CBS
|-
|NCIS: Los Angeles| align=center| "Blye K"
|Troy James Brown
|}

Outstanding Stunt Coordination for a Comedy Series or Variety Program

2020s

Programs with multiple awards

3 awards
 Shameless2 awards
 Brooklyn Nine-Nine Chuck GLOWPrograms with multiple nominations

6 nominations
 Brooklyn Nine-Nine5 nominations
 Shameless4 nominations
 Saturday Night Live3 nominations
 Chuck It's Always Sunny in Philadelphia Cobra Kai2 nominations
 Angie Tribeca Community GLOW Unbreakable Kimmy Schmidt''

References

Stunt Coordination for a Comedy Series or Variety Program